Libiszów may refer to the following villages in Poland:
 Libiszów, Lublin Voivodeship (east Poland)
 Libiszów, Łódź Voivodeship (central Poland)

See also: Libiszów-Kolonia